Lincoln Rafael Díaz-Balart (born Lincoln Rafael Díaz-Balart y Caballero; August 13, 1954) is a Cuban-American attorney and politician. He is a member of the Republican Party. He previously served in the Florida House of Representatives and the Florida Senate. He retired from Congress in 2011 and his younger brother, Mario Díaz-Balart, who had previously represented , succeeded him. He is currently chairman of the Congressional Hispanic Leadership Institute. After leaving Congress, he started a law practice and a consulting firm, both based in Miami, Florida.

Early life and education
Díaz-Balart was born in Havana, Cuba, to the late Cuban politician Rafael Díaz-Balart and Hilda Caballero Brunet. His aunt, Mirta Díaz-Balart, was the first wife of the late Fidel Castro. Her son, and his cousin was the late Dr. Fidel Ángel "Fidelito" Castro Díaz-Balart. His uncle is the Cuban-Spanish painter, Waldo Díaz-Balart.

He was educated at the American School of Madrid in Spain; New College of Florida; and Case Western Reserve University, from which he earned a law degree. He was involved in a Miami private practice for several years before holding elective office.

Political career
In 1982, he ran for a Florida House of Representatives seat for District 113 as a Democrat and lost to the Republican, Humberto Cortina.

Díaz-Balart, as well as his immediate family, were all members of the Democratic Party. Díaz-Balart was the former president of the Dade County Young Democrats and the Florida Young Democrats, as well as a member of the executive committee of the Dade County Democratic Party.
On April 24, 1985, Diaz-Balart, his wife, and brother Mario switched their registrations to Republican.

Díaz-Balart served as a Republican in the Florida House of Representatives from 1986 to 1989 and in the Florida Senate from 1989 to 1992.

U.S. House of Representatives

Congressional committees
 Committee on Rules (Vice Chairman 2005–2007)
 Subcommittee on Legislative and Budget Process (Chairman 2005–2007, Ranking Member 2007–2011)
 Committee on Homeland Security
 Subcommittee on Rules (Chairman 2003–2005)

Party leadership
 House Republican Policy Committee

Political positions
In general, Diaz-Balart's voting record has been moderate by Republican standards. His lifetime rating from the American Conservative Union is 73.

In 1994, he was one of only three Republican incumbents not to sign the Republican Contract with America. He objected to provisions in its welfare reform section that would deny federal programs to legal immigrants.

In 2006, he voted against the Federal Marriage Amendment and in 2009 voted for the Matthew Shepard and James Byrd, Jr. Hate Crimes Prevention Act, which expanded the federal hate crime law to include a person's perceived gender, sexual orientation, identity or disability. In December 2010, Diaz-Balart was one of fifteen Republican House members to vote in favor of repealing the United States military's "Don't Ask, Don't Tell" ban on openly gay service members.

He was a sponsor of the Homeland Security Act. He was a sponsor of the DREAM Act which seeks to facilitate access for illegal immigrant students to post-secondary education by allowing states to have power to determine requirements for in-state tuition.

He achieved passage into law of historic pieces of legislation – such as the Nicaraguan Adjustment and Central American Relief Act (NACARA), and the codification of the U.S. embargo on Cuba (requiring that all political prisoners be freed and multi-party elections scheduled in Cuba before U.S. sanctions can be lifted). Diaz-Balart took the rule to the floor of the House for passage of the legislation that created the Department of Homeland Security and the extension (for 25 years) of the Voting Rights Act.

Cuba
Diaz-Balart played a prominent role in the Cuban-American lobby, and was active in the  attempt by relatives of Elian Gonzalez to gain custody of the six-year-old from his Cuban father. Diaz-Balart was a member of the Congressional Cuba Democracy Caucus.

Healthcare
In March 2010, Diaz-Balart publicly called the passage of the Patient Protection and Affordable Care Act "a decisive step in the weakening of the United States."

2008 financial crisis
On September 29, 2008, Diaz-Balart voted against the Emergency Economic Stabilization Act of 2008 "American taxpayers should not have to foot the bill for the irresponsible behavior of Wall Street executives. The average citizen is forced to play by the rules, yet many who did not now get a massive bailout from taxpayers in this plan. This is fundamentally unfair. By bailing out reckless behavior we encourage future reckless behavior."

Political campaigns

1992 to 1998
In 1992, Diaz-Balart defeated fellow State Senator Javier Souto in the Republican primary for the newly created 21st District. No other party put up a candidate, assuring Diaz-Balart's election. He was unopposed for reelection in 1994, 1996, 2000, and 2002 and defeated Democrat Patrick Cusack with 75 percent in 1998.

2004 and 2006

In both 2004 and 2006, Lincoln Diaz-Balart was unsuccessfully challenged by Frank J. Gonzalez , a Libertarian Party candidate in 2004 and Democrat in 2006. In 2004, Diaz-Balart won with 73% of the vote. In 2006, Diaz-Balart won with 59% of the vote.

In 2004, Gonzalez ran for U.S. House as the Libertarian Party candidate and spent around $12,000 and earned 54,736 votes or 27% of the total.

In 2006, Gonzalez managed to earn 45,522 votes or 41% according to the Florida Department of State's Division of Elections website.

2008

Diaz-Balart's Democratic opponent in 2008 was former Hialeah Mayor Raul L. Martinez. It was initially thought that Diaz-Balart would face his toughest race to date. Although the 21st District is considered the most Republican district in the Miami area, Martinez was thought to be very popular in the area. Nevertheless, Diaz-Balart won re-election with 58% of the vote.

2010

In February 2010, Diaz-Balart announced his intention not to seek re-election. His brother, Congressman Mario Díaz-Balart, ran to succeed him and won.

Personal life
Díaz-Balart is married to Cristina Fernandez and had two children: Lincoln Jr. and Daniel. Lincoln died on May 19, 2013, at the age of 29. His family said he had battled depression for many years.

Díaz-Balart's brother, Mario Díaz-Balart, previously represented the 25th district of Florida, moved to the 21st district, but moved back to the 25th district after redistricting. He has two other brothers: José Díaz-Balart, a journalist and anchorman of the Saturday edition of the NBC Nightly News, and Rafael Díaz-Balart, a consultant.

See also
List of Hispanic and Latino Americans in the United States Congress

References

External links
 U.S. Congressman Lincoln Diaz-Balart official U.S. House website
 
 
 Profile at SourceWatch

|-

|-

|-

1954 births
Living people
American politicians of Cuban descent
Case Western Reserve University School of Law alumni
Cuban emigrants to the United States
Lincoln
Republican Party Florida state senators
Hispanic and Latino American state legislators in Florida
Hispanic and Latino American members of the United States Congress
Republican Party members of the Florida House of Representatives
New College of Florida alumni
Opposition to Fidel Castro
People from Havana
People with acquired American citizenship
Republican Party members of the United States House of Representatives from Florida
Exiles of the Cuban Revolution in the United States
21st-century American politicians
Members of Congress who became lobbyists